Tauk may refer to:

Millennium Tauk
William Tauk, MP for Sussex
Tauk (band), an American band from Long Island, New York
A meteorite which fell in Iraq in 1929; see meteorite fall